Uranophora iridis is a moth in the subfamily Arctiinae. It was described by George Hampson in 1898. It is found in Bolivia.

References

External links

Moths described in 1898
Euchromiina